Federico Peña Boulevard, named for former Denver Mayor Federico Peña, is an  freeway located in Adams County and the City and County of Denver, Colorado. The freeway, which opened in 1993, provides the primary vehicular access into Denver International Airport which opened at the same time. Peña Boulevard begins as an extension of Airport Boulevard in Aurora at an interchange with Interstate 70 (I-70) and travels north, then east to end at the airport, with an intermediate interchange with the E-470 tollway.

Route description

Peña Boulevard begins at an interchange with I-70 in Aurora as a northern continuation of Airport Boulevard. The first freeway interchange is at East 40th Avenue, which also provides traffic access to and from to Aurora's Airport Boulevard running to the south. Travelers leaving the airport use this exit for access to eastbound I-70 through the adjacent Airport Boulevard/I-70 interchange. Travelers inbound to the airport from I-70 East do not have access to the first interchange.  Continuing north, the freeway leaves Aurora and passes into the Denver Gateway area, Aurora's Gateway Park development is adjacent. An interchange with Green Valley Ranch Boulevard provides access to the neighborhood of the same name. The East 56th Avenue interchange is the final exit along Peña Boulevard before it turns east near the Rocky Mountain Arsenal National Wildlife Refuge, and reaches the interchange with Tower Road, which serves several airport hotels.

The only intermediate freeway interchange on Peña Boulevard is a full cloverleaf interchange with the tolled E-470, which provides an alternate north–south route to I-25 for travelers wishing to bypass on the eastern side of Metropolitan Denver area. E-470 also intersects I-70 and has a  higher speed limit than Peña Boulevard. The interchange with E-470 is the easternmost exit before entering Denver International Airport. Once inside airport grounds, the freeway intersects the car rental return area, and connects to the parking garages and terminal access roads.

The segment of the freeway between I-70 and E-470 is listed on the National Highway System (NHS), a system of roads that are important to the nation's economy, defense and mobility. The portion between E-470 and the airport is listed as a MAP-21 NHS Principal Arterial.

History
Construction of the $18 million (equivalent to $ in ) freeway, which opened in 1995, was halted for six weeks during summer 1992 due to a family of burrowing owls living in the right-of-way near the interchange at 56th Avenue. Ten thousand people were employed during the construction of the airport and the connecting freeway. The toll booth was removed in 2000, and new booths were installed at the exits of the airport parking garages. Peña Boulevard was named for Federico Peña because he was very influential in bringing about the construction of Denver International Airport.

Future
For many years, there was no westbound ramp from Tower Road to Peña Boulevard. This missing ramp was finally added and opened to the public in October 2018, completing the interchange.

The Denver City Council has approved an expansion of the freeway; the project will add lanes, modify interchanges, add new signage, and modify many areas along the route at a cost of $93 million. The Jackson Gap interchange will become a Diverging diamond interchange, with a Texas U-turn style ramp between the westbound Peña off-ramp and eastbound Peña onramp for traffic to return to the terminal. The project is expected to begin in January 2020, and last around two-and-a-half years.

Exit list

See also

References

External links

 

Transportation in Denver
Denver metropolitan area
Transportation in Aurora, Colorado
Freeways in the United States
Transportation in Adams County, Colorado